Zalman Shimon Dworkin was the Chief Rabbi of the Jewish community in Crown Heights, Brooklyn, and a member of the Chabad Hasidic movement.

Biography
Dworkin was born in 1901 in Rogachov, Belarus. He emigrated to the United States in 1958. He served as the Crown Heights Jewish community's chief rabbi until his passing in 1985. Dworkin was succeeded in this role by Yehuda Kalmen Marlow.

As Dworkin was a Chabad Chassid, his rabbinic authority was sought by the Lubavitcher Rebbe, Menachem Mendel Schneerson.

References

1901 births
1985 deaths
Soviet Jews
Soviet emigrants to the United States
Orthodox rabbis from New York City
20th-century American rabbis